Pedro "Pete" Velasco Jr. (born April 6, 1937, in Honolulu, Hawaii) is an American former volleyball player who competed in the 1964 Summer Olympics and in the 1968 Summer Olympics.

References

1937 births
Living people
American men's volleyball players
Olympic volleyball players of the United States
Volleyball players at the 1964 Summer Olympics
Volleyball players at the 1968 Summer Olympics
Volleyball players at the 1967 Pan American Games
Pan American Games gold medalists for the United States
Pan American Games silver medalists for the United States
Volleyball players at the 1963 Pan American Games
Pan American Games medalists in volleyball
Medalists at the 1963 Pan American Games